Eucalyptus microcarpa, commonly known as grey box, is a species of tree that is endemic to southeastern continental Australia. It has rough, fibrous or flaky bark on the trunk, smooth whitish bark above, lance-shaped adult leaves, flower buds in groups of between seven and eleven, white flowers and oval, cylindrical or urn-shaped fruit.

Description
It has rough, fibrous or flaky bark on the trunk as far as the larger branches, smooth greyish or whitish bark above. Flowering occurs between February and June and the flowers are white or cream coloured.

Taxonomy
Grey box was first formally described in 1902 by Joseph Maiden who gave it the name Eucalyptus hemiphloia var. microcarpa in the Transactions, proceedings and report, Royal Society of South Australia. (Eucalyptus hemiphloia had previously been described by Ferdinand von Mueller, but that name is now accepted as a synonym of Eucalyptus moluccana.) In 1923, Maiden raised the variety to species status as E. microcarpa. The specific epithet (microcarpa) means "small-fruited".

Distribution and habitat
Eucalyptus microcarpa occurs in Queensland, New South Wales, Victoria and South Australiais widespread and locally abundant inland from the Great Dividing Range in New South Wales. In Victoria it is found from the Wimmera east to south of Benalla and also occurs in Queensland. In South Australia, its distribution includes the Mount Lofty Ranges and Heywood Park near Adelaide. It is associated with grassy woodland and loamy soils.

Conservation status
This eucalypt is a component of the grey box (E. microcarpa) grassy woodlands and derived native grasslands of south- eastern Australia that is listed as "endangered" under the Australian Government Environment Protection and Biodiversity Conservation Act 1999.

See also
 List of Eucalyptus species

References

External links
 

Flora of New South Wales
Flora of Queensland
Flora of South Australia
Flora of Victoria (Australia)
Trees of Australia
microcarpa
Myrtales of Australia
Plants described in 1902
Taxa named by Joseph Maiden